Tubercularia lateritia is a fungal saprobe or plant pathogen that sometimes infects avocados. It grows mostly on decaying bark and rotting wood in tropical countries. It is an asexual fungus (anamorph) and is correctly known by the different name used for its sexual state (teleomorph), Nectria pseudotrichia. The asexual state and sexual state are often, but not always, found together.

See also
 List of avocado diseases

References

External links
 USDA ARS Fungal Database

Fungal plant pathogens and diseases
Avocado tree diseases
Nectriaceae
Fungi described in 1985